Paul Wahlberg (born March 20, 1964) is an American chef and reality TV star. With his brothers Mark and Donnie, he runs the dining burger restaurant and bar Wahlburgers and stars in the reality television show also titled Wahlburgers.

Background
Born in Boston to Alma and Donald Wahlberg, he is the fifth of nine children and the first of his siblings to graduate from high school.

As a child, he was interested in watching cooking shows like The Galloping Gourmet. He decided to become a chef when he was 17.

Career
Paul found a love for the culinary industry working for Joseph's catering, run by the Calapa family of Braintree, Massachusetts. After high school, he worked at several restaurants, including The Charles Hotel, The Four Seasons and Bridgeman's in Hull, Massachusetts, where he served as executive chef for nine years.

Personal life
Married, Wahlberg lives in Hingham, Massachusetts.  He has two children.

References

External links
 

1964 births
American people of Swedish descent
American restaurateurs
Living people
People from Dorchester, Massachusetts
People from Hingham, Massachusetts
Paul